Lost Together may refer to:

 Lost Together (Blue Rodeo album), 1992, or the title song
 Lost Together (The Rembrandts album), 2001, or the title song
 Lost Forever // Lost Together, 2014 album by Architects